Jarmo Lampela (born 9 October 1964) is a Finnish film director and screenwriter. He has directed more than 15 films since 1988. His 2003 film Eila was entered into the 25th Moscow International Film Festival. In 2013 he is scheduled to direct a new film Werther.

Selected filmography
 Freakin' Beautiful World (1997)
 The River (2001)
 Eila (2003)

References

External links

1964 births
Living people
Finnish film directors
Finnish screenwriters
People from Rovaniemi